Midland Oil Company is a state-owned oil company and is Iraq's fourth oil company. It is responsible for overseeing development in recently auctioned fields in the centre of the country. It has been announced to be launched by the Iraqi Ministry of Oil.

See also

 Iraq oil law (2007)
 North Oil Company
 South Oil Company

References

Oil and gas companies of Iraq
Government-owned companies of Iraq